Frieden (German: peace) is a surname. Notable people with the surname include:

 A. C. Frieden, mystery author and lawyer
 B. Roy Frieden, mathematical physicist
 Lex Frieden, educator, researcher, disability policy expert and disability rights activist
 Luc Frieden
 Pierre Frieden
 Rob Frieden
 Tanja Frieden, Swiss snowboarder
 Thomas R. Frieden, MD MPH, New York City Commissioner of Health